

Early stages of embryogenesis of tailless amphibians

Embryogenesis in living creatures occurs in different ways depending on class and species. One of the most basic criteria of such development is independence from a water habitat.

Amphibians were the earliest animals to adapt themselves to a mixed environment containing both water and dry land.

The embryonic development of tailless amphibians is presented below using the African clawed frog (Xenopus laevis) and the northern leopard frog (Rana pipiens) as examples.

The oocyte in these frog species is a polarized cell - it has specified axes and poles. The animal pole of the cell contains pigment cells, whereas the vegetal pole (the yolk) contains most of the nutritive material. The pigment is composed of light-absorbing melanin.

The sperm cell enters the oocyte in the region of the animal pole. Two blocks - defensive mechanisms meant to prevent polyspermy - occur: the fast block and the slow block. A relatively short time after fertilization, the cortical cytoplasm (located just beneath the cell membrane) rotates by 30 degrees. This results in the creation of the gray crescent. Its establishment determines the location of the dorsal and ventral (up-down) axis, as well as of the anterior and posterior (front-back) axis and the dextro-sinistral (left-right) axis of the embryo.

Embryo cleavage
The cleavage (cell division in an embryo) of a frog’s embryo is complete and uneven, because most of the yolk is gathered in the vegetal region. The first cleavage runs across the animal-vegetal axis, dividing the gray crescent into two parts. The second cleavage also cuts through the gray crescent, although always running perpendicularly to the first one. This results in the creation of four identical blastomeres - separate cells now forming the embryo. The third cleavage runs equatorially and closer to the animal pole, thus creating blastomeres of unequal size (micromeres in the animal region and macromeres in the vegetal region). Due to the fact that macromeres contain more yolk, it is easier for the micromeres to further divide themselves.

An embryo counting 16 to 64 blastomeres is called a morula. From the stage of having 128 cells, the embryo develops a cavity, the blastocoele, and is called a blastula. In the moment in which the creation of cleavages becomes asynchronous, a midblastula transition occurs. This means that the genetic material of the embryo begins transcription.

The rate at which cleavages occur depends on the species and on the temperature of the organism’s environment. For example, divisions in R.pipiens embryo occur once every hour, whereas in the X.laevis embryo – once every half hour. Higher temperature determines a faster division rate. The R.pipiens embryo reaches its 8-cell stage in 5.5 hours in the temperature of 18 degrees Celsius, and X.laevis does so in 4.5 hours in the same temperature.
When the embryo is composed of over 10.000 blastomeres (R.pipiens – after 25 or 26 hours), the next stage of embryonic development begins – gastrulation, which lasts around 24 hours.

Gastrulation

The first visible stage of gastrulation is the creation of a concavity on the dorsal side, right under the gray crescent. In this place begins the infiltration of cells of the future mesoderm. From this moment the embryo is called a gastrula, and the concave, visible from outside, is the emerging blastopore. Over the upper edge of the blastopore, called the dorsal lip, a migration of cells occurs, which derive from the central area of the gray crescent. The process of involution takes place – the dorsal lip turns in upon itself. The moving cells enter the blastocoele. As the blastopore deepens, a new embryonic cavity develops, the primitive gut, or the archenteron. It grows in length towards the future front part of the embryo. It can be seen from outside the embryo that the dorsal lip curves itself and grows, creating the side lips of the blastopore. During this time, the paraxial mesoderm enters the embryo. It will change into somitomeres. The bottom of the archenteron is composed of macromeres. They later transform into the gut of the embryo. The ventral lip of the blastopore develops, and the lateral plate mesoderm enters the blastocoel through it. The blastopore develops a ring-like shape, and surrounds the macromeres, creating the yolk sac. The process of involution occurs simultaneously with the process of epiboly, a cell movement associated with the covering of the embryo by the ectoderm. The blastopore gradually closes, and the macromeres, which are endodermal cells, are pulled inside of the embryo (the process of emboly). It can be seen from the outside as the shrinking of the yolk sac. Near the end of gastrulation, the yolk sac becomes entirely covered by the ectoderm, and the blastopore assumes the shape of a vertical cleavage. The three germ layers form a characteristic shape. The ectoderm is the outermost layer, the mesoderm is the middle one, and the endoderm forms the inside layer. Only in the locations of the future body openings (the mouth and the anus), the endoderm remains in immediate contact with the ectoderm. At the next stage of development, which is known as neurulation, the embryo grows in length along the anterior-posterior axis. Differentiation of the germ layers also occurs.

Cells communicate , which means that the type of environment of specific cells implies their future roles in the development of the embryo.

References
1. Maleszewski, Marek.Ćwiczenia z biologii rozwoju zwierząt, p. 49-55, Wydawnictwa Uniwersytetu Warszawskiego, Warsaw 2007

Embryology